Dracophilus is a genus of flowering plants belonging to the family Aizoaceae.

Its native range is Namibia to South African Republic.

Species:

Dracophilus dealbatus 
Dracophilus delaetianus

References

Aizoaceae
Aizoaceae genera